O&G may refer to:
 Obstetrics and gynaecology, surgical specialties dealing with the female reproductive organs
 Obstetrics & Gynecology (journal), a scientific journal of the American College of Obstetricians and Gynecologists
 O&G (magazine), a magazine published by the Royal Australian and New Zealand College of Obstetricians and Gynaecologists
Oil and gas, hydrocarbons extracted from the subsurface